Distant Shores is a comedy-drama first shown in the United Kingdom on ITV in January 2005.  Like the similar fish out of water dramedies, Northern Exposure and Doc Martin, it focuses on the difficulties of an unwillingly-transplanted metropolitan doctor who is forced to adjust to a rural environment.

Concept
Peter Davison plays a successful London plastic surgeon Bill Shore.  In a bid to save their marriage, his wife Lisa, played by Samantha Bond, accepts a six-month veterinary research job on a small Northumbrian island called Hildasay. Bill reluctantly agrees to relocate on the island with his wife, daughter and son.  The stories revolve around the various ways in which the family adjust to the island and its welcoming, but sometimes peculiar, inhabitants.  The dominant themes of series 1 are Bill's attempts to leave the island, and the tragedy which befalls Lisa as she gradually pursues an adulterous relationship with one of its inhabitants.  This overarching storyline is essentially reversed in series 2, with Lisa wanting to return to London and Bill considering starting an affair on Hildasay.

Broadcast history
The first series was broadcast in 2005 on ITV.   According to one of the show's recurring co-stars, Yvette Rowland, it was "immensely popular", and brought in a viewership of over 6 million. Canadian press releases put the number slightly lower at 5.2 million, but still called the programme "a major hit for Britain's ITV".

Actual ratings data shows both these numbers to be correct, if incomplete.  The Broadcasters' Audience Research Board reported that the debut episode of the series was the 20th most popular programme in the United Kingdom for the week ending 9 January 2005, with 7.53 million initial viewers.  It was one of only three non-soap operas in the top 20 that week. From this high-water mark, however, the show's audience declined, hovering between 5.2 and 6.2 million viewers.  Despite this slip, it usually won its 9 pm time slot.  In the last two weeks of the run, however, BBC1 won the time slot due to special programming.

A second series was filmed for the next television season, copyrighted 2006. However, it was not aired in the United Kingdom, resulting in the original run of the programme being only six weeks. Rowland has described ITV's failure to broadcast the second series as "a mystery". Davison himself agreed with Rowland's diagnosis in April 2007 when he expressed puzzlement over the shelving of the show, adding, "There's a fair chance it will never be shown in Britain."

Nevertheless, the second series aired outside the UK.   In Australia it debuted on Seven Network it was aired on Hallmark Channel in 2009 and repeated again in 2011 on 7TWO. In Canada, it premiered on VisionTV, while in the United States, it was initially syndicated to PBS stations for a two-year period from December 2006 to December 2008.

Critical reception
During its initial run, two media reporters for The Guardian concluded much the same thing about the series: that it was "genial" or "very comforting" viewing, but that it was an obvious twin of shows like Doc Martin and Ballykissangel.  The Times agreed, calling the show "an even cosier version of Two Thousand Acres of Sky and Doc Martin" which was "undemanding, predictable and pleasant". Indeed, the similarities to Doc Martin were obvious enough to have crept into pre-launch publicity.  Peter Davison responded to the charges in a personality piece in The Journal of Newcastle by saying, "It's only like Doc Martin on paper ... Distant Shores has a completely different tone and feel to it."

References

External links

2000s British drama television series
2005 British television series debuts
2005 British television series endings
ITV television dramas
English-language television shows